Christian Marquis (born 20 October 1953) is a French rower. He competed in the men's quadruple sculls event at the 1980 Summer Olympics.

References

1953 births
Living people
French male rowers
Olympic rowers of France
Rowers at the 1980 Summer Olympics
Place of birth missing (living people)